The Death-Throws are a team of supervillains appearing in American comic books published by Marvel Comics. They first appeared in Captain America #317 (May 1986) and were created by Mark Gruenwald and Paul Neary. Introduced as enemies of Hawkeye, the Death-Throws consists primarily of jugglers who each use various juggling props as weapons.

Publication history
Bombshell and Oddball first appeared in Hawkeye Vol.1 #3-4 (1983) and battled the title character. They later joined the juggling supervillain team known as the Death-Throws to face Hawkeye in the pages of Captain America #317 (1986) and Avengers Spotlight #23-25 (1989). Oddball battled Hawkeye once again in Hawkeye: Earth's Mightiest Marksman #1 (1998).

The Death-Throws later appeared in Union Jack Vol.2 #1-2 (2006) and had cameo appearances in Captain America #411-414 (1993) and Avengers: The Initiative #27 (2009).The Death-Throws have also had notable entries in the Official Handbook of the Marvel Universe Vol.2 (Deluxe Edition) #3 (1985) and Dark Reign Files #1 (2009).

The members of the Death-Throws have made various minor solo appearances. Bombshell has appeared in Captain America #388-392 (1991), Spectacular Spider-Man Annual #12 (1992), Web of Spider-Man Annual #8 (1992), New Warriors Annual #2 (1992) and Villains for Hire #1-4 (2011). Oddball has featured in Captain America #395 (1991), Guardians of the Galaxy #28 (1992) and Wolverine Vol.2 #167 (2001). Knickknack has had cameo appearances in Thunderbolts #53 (2001), Wolverine Vol.3 #26 (2005) and Dark Reign: The Hood #1 (2009).

Crossfire's robotic army of Death T.H.R.O.W.S. have appeared in Hawkeye & Mockingbird #2-5 (2010) and The Heroic Age: Villains #1 (2011).

Fictional team history
The Ringleader and the Healey brothers (Oddball and Tenpin) came together to form the juggling-themed supervillain group, the Death-Throws. Knickknack was later recruited as the fourth member of the group. Oddball, given to his eccentric behaviour, quit the Death-Throws and branched out on his own. Oddball was hired, along with Bombshell, by Crossfire to battle Hawkeye and Mockingbird. The two supervillains subdued the heroes and delivered them to Crossfire. Later, when Hawkeye had managed to escape, Bombshell, Oddball and Crossfire were defeated and handed over to the authorities. Bombshell and Oddball were broken out of prison by Oddball's brother, Tenpin, and became members of the Death-Throws.

Oddball was contacted by Crossfire to break him out of prison. The Death-Throws took the job and were successful in their mission. But when Crossfire couldn't pay them for their services, the Death-Throws held him for ransom to lure Hawkeye into an ambush. The team were later defeated by Hawkeye, Mockingbird and Captain America. Sometime later, Crossfire placed a bounty on archer's right arm as he attempted to gain revenge against Hawkeye. The Death-Throws (along with the Brothers Grimm, Bobcat, Bullet Biker, Mad Dog, and Razor Fist) looked to cash in on the reward. The group, along with the rest of the supervillains, were defeated by Hawkeye, Mockingbird and Trick Shot.

Johnny Guitar and Doctor Sax, who were minor supervillains known for battling Dazzler, later applied for membership into the Death-Throws. However, the two music-themed supervillains were quickly rejected on the basis that they couldn't juggle.

Going solo
Bombshell underwent a genetic experiment to gain superpowers, gaining the ability to fire explosive energy blasts from her hands. Bombshell then joined an all female team of supervillains called the Femizons. The team were later defeated by Captain America. Bombshell's experimental new powers soon faded. Justin Hammer hired a number of supervillains (including Bombshell) to battle Spider-Man and the New Warriors. Justin Hammer and the supervillains then allied themselves with the Sphinx When Sphinx revealed his true intentions of total world domination, Bombshell panicked and fled.

After being seen playing a game of pool with 8-Ball in the Bar with No Name, Oddball was recruited by Doctor Octopus to join his incarnation of the Masters of Evil. The team were quickly defeated by the Guardians of the Galaxy. Oddball was later hired by Albino and Taskmaster to once again battle Hawkeye. He was defeated by the archer and the young Avengers recruits Justice and Firestar. Oddball was later killed while taking part in the Bloodsport competition in Madripoor. He was slain in the first round of the tournament by a tribal warrior called the Headhunter.

S.H.I.E.L.D. reported that Knickknack was killed and resurrected to serve HYDRA and the Hand as part of their supervillain army. All the supervillains involved were released from the Hand's control and returned to normal.

Return as team
Orville Bock was hired by the Death-Throws to become the new Oddball, adopting the original Oddball's costume and trick juggling balls. The Death-Throws, along with Crossfire, were hired by R.A.I.D to take part in a terrorist attack on London. The team attacked civilians from the top of Tower Bridge, but soon come into conflict with Union Jack and Sabra. Despite gaining the upper hand early in the battle, the Death-Throws and Crossfire were soon defeated. Bombshell, the last member of the team left standing, defused her bombs and surrendered.

The Death-Throws were among the supervillains researched by Quasimodo, on behalf of Norman Osborn, as potential villainous recruits for H.A.M.M.E.R. and the Initiative. Knickknack later appeared as a member of Hood's crime syndicate. Bombshell, along with her previous employer Crossfire, was hired to join Misty Knight's Villains for Hire team in a battle against the Purple Man.

During the "Devil's Reign" storyline, the Death-Throws members Ringleader, Bombshell, and Tenpin were shown as inmates of the Myrmidon. When 8-Ball offered to sit with them, they turn him down.

Members

Bombshell

Bombshell juggles various anti-personnel weapons including hand grenades, stun grenades, and smoke bombs.

Knickknack
Nicholas "Nick" Grossman was born in Secaucus, New Jersey. He later became a circus performer and juggler. Grossman then went to become a juggling supervillain known as the Knickknack and a member of the supervillain team, the Death-Throws. Knickknack was hired along with the Death-Throws by Crossfire to help him escape from prison. The Death-Throws complete their mission, but decide to hold Crossfire hostage instead. The group are defeated and arrested by Hawkeye, Mockingbird and Captain America. Later, Knickknack and the rest of the Death-Throws, along with various other supervillains, attempt to claim the bounty put on Hawkeye's right arm by Crossfire. However, all of the supervillains looking to claim the bounty are defeated by Hawkeye, Mockingbird and Trick Shot. Later, Knickknack and the Death-Throws are hired by R.A.I.D to take part in a terrorist attack on London. They attack civilians from the top of Tower Bridge, but soon come into battle with Union Jack and Sabra. Knickknack appears as a member of Hood's crime syndicate. In flashback, Knickknack appears alongside Ringleader as he turns down Johnny Guitar and Doctor Sax for membership into the Death-Throws on the basis that the two music-themed supervillains couldn't juggle.

Powers and Abilities: Knickknack juggles an assortment of bladed instruments including meat cleavers, hunting knives and chainsaws.

Elton Healey

Oddball juggles various trick juggling balls including acid balls, smoke balls, and explosive balls.

Orville Bock

Like the original Oddball, this version of Oddball can also juggle various trick juggling balls including acid balls, smoke balls, and explosive balls.

Ringleader
Charles Last was born in San Francisco, California. He went to become a juggling supervillain known as the Ringleader and the leader of the supervillain team, the Death-Throws. Ringleader was hired along with the Death-Throws by Crossfire to help him escape from prison. The Death-Throws complete their mission, but decide to hold Crossfire hostage instead. The group are defeated and arrested by Hawkeye, Mockingbird and Captain America. Later, Ringleader and the rest of the Death-Throws, along with various other supervillains, attempt to claim the bounty put on Hawkeye's right arm by Crossfire. However, all of the supervillains looking to claim the bounty are defeated by Hawkeye, Mockingbird and Trick Shot. Later, Ringleader and the Death-Throws are hired by R.A.I.D to take part in a terrorist attack on London. They attack civilians from the top of Tower Bridge, but soon come into battle with Union Jack and Sabra.In flashback, Ringleader turns down Johnny Guitar and Doctor Sax for membership into the Death-Throws on the basis that the two music-themed supervillains couldn't juggle.

Powers and Abilities: Ringleader juggles razor-sharp rings.

Tenpin
Alvin Healey was born in Reno, Nevada. He went to become a juggling supervillain known as the Tenpin and a member of the Death-Throws supervillain team. When his brother Elton Healey (known as the supervillain Oddball) was arrested after an encounter with Hawkeye, Tenpin broke his brother out of prison.

Tenpin was hired along with the Death-Throws by Crossfire to help escape from prison. The Death-Throws complete their mission, but decide to hold Crossfire hostage instead. The group are defeated and arrested by Hawkeye, Mockingbird and Captain America. Later, Tenpin and the rest of the Death-Throws, along with various other supervillains, attempt to claim the bounty put on Hawkeye's right arm by Crossfire. However, all of the supervillains looking to claim the bounty are defeated by Hawkeye, Mockingbird and Trick Shot.

Tenpin's brother Oddball was killed by Headhunter while taking part in a Bloodsport tournament in Madripoor.

Later, Tenpin and the Death-Throws are hired by R.A.I.D to take part in a terrorist attack on London. They attack civilians from the top of Tower Bridge, but soon come into battle with Union Jack and Sabra.

Powers and Abilities: Tenpin is an expert juggler. He juggles with flaming, specially weighted, bowling pins which he also uses as projectiles. Tenpin also learned to be a street fighter in his younger days with his brother, Elton.

Death T.H.R.O.W.S.
In the past, the supervillain Crossfire was known to employ the Death-Throws as his foot soldiers. However, deciding to leave behind the "fifth rate hacks in ridiculous costumes", Crossfire created a new army for himself. His "Death T.H.R.O.W.S". (Techno Hybrid Remotely Operated Weapons Systems) are robotic constructs that obey only his commands and each carry a small capable arsenal concealed within their armored shells. Crossfire used his Death T.H.R.O.W.S. to battle his old enemies Hawkeye and Mockingbird.

Originally, the robotic Death T.H.R.O.W.S. were known as 'Magnum Z's'. The Magnum Z's were fully automated smart soldiers created for the United States. But the US senate ceased their development when they realised that the Magnum Z's abilities were in conflict with the Geneva Convention. Crossfire acquired some of the defunct Magnum Z's to use in a plot to conquer the Isle of El Guapo, then later adapted them for his own purposes.

Other versions

Mini Marvels
The Death-Throws make a cameo appearance in the Mini Marvels cartoon comic strip storyline "Paperboy Showdown" featured in Spidey and the Mini Marvels #1 (2003) and collected in Mini Marvels: Ultimate Collection (2009). The team can be seen playing basketball in the background in the Daily Bugle's paperboy training facility.

Solo versions
Versions of Bombshell and Oddball have appeared in the Last Avengers Story #1-2 (1995) which is set in an alternative future. In the Ultimate Marvel universe, two characters appear using the Bombshell codename. The Bombshells are a mother/daughter team of criminals. Lori Baumgartner and her young daughter Lana are mutants whose powers are activated when they are close to one another. They have the ability to fire explosive energy beams from their hands. In their first appearance, the foul-mouthed Bombshells attempted to rob a bank vault but are foiled by Spider-Man. Later, they attempted to rob an armored truck until the Human Torch and Spider-Woman arrived on the scene and defeated them.

In other media
 A character inspired by Alvin Healy named John Healy appears in season one of the live-action Marvel Cinematic Universe television series Daredevil, portrayed by Alex Morf. This version is a veteran assassin under Wilson Fisk's employ. Healy is hired to kill Prohaska, a rival of Fisk's Russian mafia associates Anatoly and Vladimir Ranskahov. After acquiring a gun from Turk Barrett, Healy approaches Prohaska, disarms the bodyguard, and tries to shoot Prohaska. However, the gun jams, forcing Healy to fight and kill Prohaska before surrendering to the arriving police. James Wesley hires Nelson & Murdock to defend Healy by claiming self-defense. Disliking Healy, Foggy Nelson initially tries to turn down the case, but Matt Murdock overrules the decision to gain information on Healy. When Healy goes to trial, Murdock realizes that several of the jurors are being blackmailed by Fisk. Despite Murdock's best efforts, the jury deadlocks, and Healy is released without a retrial. He is later accosted by Murdock, who interrogates Healy for his benefactor's name. Realizing that neither he nor his loved ones will be safe if he confesses, Healy abruptly kills himself.
 Tenpin appears in M.O.D.O.K., voiced by Chris Parnell. This version is an inept supervillain who primarily hangs out at the Bar with No Name.

References

External links
 
 Bombshell at the Appendix to the Handbook of the Marvel Universe
 Knickknack at the Appendix to the Handbook of the Marvel Universe
 Oddball (Elton Healey) at the Appendix to the Handbook of the Marvel Universe
 Oddball (Orville Bock) at the Appendix to the Handbook of the Marvel Universe
 Ringleader at the Appendix to the Handbook of the Marvel Universe
 Tenpin at the Appendix to the Handbook of the Marvel Universe

Characters created by Mark Gruenwald
Characters created by Paul Neary
Comics characters introduced in 1986
Fictional jugglers
Marvel Comics supervillain teams